Dolutegravir/rilpivirine, sold under the brand name Juluca, is a fixed-dose combination antiretroviral medication for the treatment of HIV/AIDS. It contains the medicines dolutegravir and rilpivirine. It is taken by mouth.

The most common adverse reactions (of all severity grades) are diarrhea and headache.

Dolutegravir/rilpivirine was approved for use in the United States in November 2017, and for use in the European Union in May 2018.


Medical uses 
Dolutegravir/rilpivirine is indicated for the treatment of human immunodeficiency virus type 1 (HIV-1) infection in adults who are virologically-suppressed (HIV-1 RNA <50 copies/mL) on a stable antiretroviral regimen for at least six months with no history of virological failure and no known or suspected resistance to any non-nucleoside reverse transcriptase inhibitor or integrase inhibitor.

References

External links
 

Fixed dose combination (antiretroviral)
Hepatotoxins